Obolo is a town in the state of Akwa Ibom in the southeast Nigeria.

Towns in Akwa Ibom State